Katie Volynets (born December 31, 2001) is an American tennis player. She achieved a career-high singles ranking of No. 74 by the Women's Tennis Association (WTA) on March 6, 2023. She won her first singles title in May 2021 on the ITF Circuit, at the $100k event in Bonita Springs.

Early life
Volynets was born in Walnut Creek, California. Her parents had emigrated from Ukraine, and she still has extended family in Kyiv and Dnipro.

Career

2019: Grand Slam debut
On August 11, 2019, Volynets won the USTA Girls 18s National Championships final over Emma Navarro, earning her a wildcard entry into the singles main draw of the US Open. She lost in the first round to Bianca Andreescu, who went on to win the tournament.

2021: WTA 1000 and Wimbledon debut
She qualified for the 2021 Wimbledon Championships for the first time at this major. In October, she also made her debut at the WTA 1000 level receiving a wildcard in Indian Wells.

2022: Top 150 debut, first Major match win
Volynets played in Indian Wells again as a wildcard where she recorded her first win at the WTA 1000-level against Arantxa Rus.
She won the USTA Wildcard Challenge for the French Open where she recorded her first Grand Slam match win over Viktorija Golubic. At the Nottingham Open, she lost to Heather Watson in the first round.

2023: Australian Open third round, top 100, First WTA semifinal
In January, she qualified for the main draw of Auckland Open, where she lost in the first round to Venus Williams, in straight sets.

She reached the Australian Open third round defeating world No. 9, Veronika Kudermetova, for her first top-10 win, and becoming the first American qualifier to reach the women's singles round of 32 at the Australian Open since Lindsay Davenport in 1993. As a result, she reached a career-high ranking of No. 96 on 30 January 2023.

At the 2023 ATX Open she rallied from 5-0 down and a match point in the third set to win her match against third seed Anastasia Potapova and reach her first WTA quarterfinal. Next she defeated wildcard Peyton Stearns to reach her first semifinal.

Performance timeline

Only main-draw results in WTA Tour, Grand Slam tournaments, Fed Cup / Billie Jean King Cup and Olympic Games are included in win–loss records.

Singles
Current after the 2023 Indian Wells Open.

ITF Circuit finals

Singles: 3 (2 titles, 1 runner–up)

Doubles: 1 (runner-up)

Top 10 wins

Notes

References

Junior success

External links
 
 

American female tennis players
2001 births
Living people
Sportspeople from Walnut Creek, California
Tennis people from California
American people of Ukrainian descent
21st-century American women